Evere is one of the 19 municipalities of the Brussels-Capital Region (Belgium). , the municipality had a population of 43,608 inhabitants. In common with all of Brussels' municipalities, it is legally bilingual (French–Dutch).

History
Evere's character was essentially rural until the end of the First World War. It was famous for its market gardeners, pioneers in the cultivation of chicory. It was also the centre of the history of aviation in Belgium between 1914 and 1945 welcoming, among others, on the neighbouring town of Haren, the Société Anonyme Belge de Constructions Aéronautiques (SABCA) and Societé Anonyme Belge d'Exploitation de la Navigation Aérienne (SABENA). Charles Lindbergh flew the Spirit of St. Louis to Evere airfield after his historic 1927 transatlantic flight to Paris. He was welcomed by a crowd of over 25,000.

After the Second World War, the explosion of population and the scarcity of free building plots in the Brussels region accelerated the disappearance of agricultural land in Evere in favor of urbanisation. From 1968 onwards, the arrival of the NATO headquarters on the disused site of the old aerodrome in Haren, also brought about the arrival of a number of companies of the tertiary sector.

Sites
 Brussels Cemetery is partly in Evere and partly in the municipality of Zaventem in Flemish Brabant.
 In September 2008, a former windmill in Evere, originally built in 1841, was opened as the 'Brussels Mill and Food Museum' (Musée bruxellois du Moulin et de l'Alimentation).
 The NATO headquarters are located near Evere in Haren (part of the City of Brussels). Besides, several major international companies have set up their headquarters near Evere, notably KPMG in Haren, Deloitte in Zaventem (previously in Diegem), and Ernst & Young in Diegem.

Sport
Evere is home to BUC Saint Josse Rugby Club, former Belgian Champions who currently play in the Belgian Elite League

Transportation
Evere is served by Evere railway station on line 26 (which goes from Halle to Vilvoorde). Bordet railway station, on the same line, is also in the municipality.

References

External links

  (in French and Dutch only)
 Archives Evere

 
Municipalities of the Brussels-Capital Region
Populated places in Belgium